Joseph Daniel Biscaha (born June 1, 1937) is a former American football player.  An offensive end, he played college football at the University of Richmond, and played professionally in the National Football League for the New York Giants in 1959, and in the American Football League for the Boston Patriots in 1960.  After signing with the New York Titans in 1961, he retired from professional football.

Biscaha played high school football at Pope Pius XII High School in Passaic, New Jersey.

Following his career in professional football, he entered the field of education where he served as a teacher of Biology and football coach at Paterson Central, John F. Kennedy High School, Passaic Valley Regional High School, and Bloomfield High School.  He also coached in the initial years for the Paterson Catholic High School program in football.  His teaching/coaching career continued for 25 years and was highlighted by three New Jersey State Championship seasons, 1975,1979 and 1980, at Passaic Valley and numerous coaching honors. After an eight-year retirement from Education, while working in financial services, he returned to serve ten years as a School Administrator at Passaic County Technical Institute until his retirement in 2005.

Having graduated from the University of Richmond with a BS in Biology, he later attained an MA in School Administration in 1966 from Seton Hall University.

References

1937 births
Living people
Players of American football from New Jersey
Sportspeople from Clifton, New Jersey
American football wide receivers
Richmond Spiders football players
New York Giants players
Boston Patriots players
Seton Hall University alumni